Travis Wall is an American soccer player.  He last played for Minnesota United FC in the North American Soccer League.

Career
Wall played his college soccer at the Ohio Wesleyan University between 2008 and 2011, before signing his first professional contract with Minnesota Stars FC on April 4, 2012. At Ohio Wesleyan he was a two-time 1st team All-American in 2010 and 2011. In 2011, he helped lead Ohio Wesleyan to the National Championship while also being named the National Player of the Year.

References

External links
 MUFC profile

1990 births
Living people
American soccer players
Minnesota United FC (2010–2016) players
North American Soccer League players
Soccer players from Ohio
Association football forwards